Kalaha is a Danish band consisting of Emil de Waal (drums), Niclas Knudsen (guitar), Rumpistol aka Jens Berents Christiansen (synthesizer) and electronic producer Mikael Elkjær aka Spejderrobot... 
The band takes inspiration from Afrobeat, Anatolian rock, electronic rave music and jazz improvisation.

Kalaha has collaborated with a wide range of artists from around the world including Hilal Kaya, Uffe Lorenzen (Spids Nøgenhat/Baby Woodrose)
In 2019 they played a show together with American bass player Bill Laswell at Black Diamond during the Copenhagen Jazz Festival.

Kalaha's debut album "Hahaha", released in 2014, was a live recording from their first show ever as a band. Their follow-up album "Masala" (2016) received a Danish Music Award (Jazz) in the category "Special Release of the Year" as well as receiving airplay by Gilles Peterson on BBC Radio 6 Music. 
Their third album "Mandala" (2019) was also well received by the critics and highlighted as album of the year in the Danish Newspaper Information. The album featured the band's first Turkish song "Çok Küstüm", which became the beginning of a long time collaboration with the Turkish singer Hilal Kaya and also secured the band some attention in Turkey.

In 2020 their single "Eymen" brought Kalaha a Danish Music Award (Roots) nomination for Danish Roots Track of The Year and their single "Dans Det Op feat. Uffe Lorenzen was nominated as "Song of the Year 2020" for the Danish Critics Award Steppeulven.

Since their 2014 debut, Kalaha has been using Danish artist Zven Balslev as their art director. Zven Balslev has also directed three of the bands music videos.

Discography

Albums

Singles & EPs

Awards

Won 
2017, Danish Music Awards – Jazz. Category: Special Release of the Year for the album "Masala"
2019, Carl Prisen. Category: Roots Composer of the Year for the EP "Mama Ngoma"

Nominated 
2017, Danish Music Awards – World. Category: Danish World composer of the year; Niclas Knudsen, Emil De Waal, Spejderrobot og Rumpistol (Kalaha)  – ‘’Quarquaba EP’
2020, Danish Music Awards – Roots. Category: Danish Roots Track of the Year for "Eymen"
2021, Steppeulven. Category: Track of the year for "Dans det op" featuring Uffe Lorentzen.

References

External links 
Official website
Kalaha on Spotify
Bandcamp – Rump Recordings
Bandcamp – April Records

Danish musical groups
Afrobeat musicians
Anatolian rock musicians